Enamorada ("Enamoured") is a 1946 Mexican drama film directed by Emilio Fernández and starring María Félix and Pedro Armendáriz. It was shot at the Churubusco Studios in Mexico City and on location in Puebla. The sets were designed by the art director Manuel Fontanals

The film was remade in 1950 as The Torch with Armendáriz repeating his role alongside Paulette Goddard who was credited as an associate producer on the film.

Plot
The revolutionary José Juan Reyes (Pedro Armendáriz) takes the town of Cholula, Puebla and demands contributions from its wealthiest citizens for the Mexican Revolution. However, his plans are disrupted when he falls in love with the Señorita Beatriz Peñafiel (María Félix), the tempestuous daughter of the town's richest man.

Notes
The film was entered into the 1947 Cannes Film Festival. The film was inspired by William Shakespeare's The Taming of the Shrew. The final scene was inspired by the final scene in Josef von Sternberg's Morocco.

This was the first María Félix and Emilio Fernández film collaboration. The others were Rio Escondido, Maclovia, Reportaje and El Rapto.

Restoration
A restoration of the film by the UCLA Film & Television Archive and the World Cinema Project was screened at the 71st edition of the Cannes Film Festival under the Cannes Classics section in May 2018.

Main cast
 María Félix as Beatriz Peñafiel 
 Pedro Armendáriz as Gen. José Juan Reyes 
 Fernando Fernández as Padre Rafael Sierra 
 José Morcillo as Carlos Peñafiel 
 Eduardo Arozamena as Alcalde Joaquín Gómez 
 Miguel Inclán as Capt. Bocanegra 
 Manuel Dondé as Fidel Bernal 
 Eugenio Rossi as Eduardo Roberts 
 Norma Hill as Rosa de Bernal 
 Juan García as Capt. Quiñones 
 José Torvay as Maestro Apolonio Sánchez 
 Pascual García Peña as Merolico

References

External links

1946 films
1946 romantic drama films
Films directed by Emilio Fernández
Mexican black-and-white films
Mexican Revolution films
1940s Spanish-language films
Estudios Churubusco films
Mexican romantic drama films
1940s Mexican films